Sara Gros Aspiroz (born 9 June 1983)is a Spanish ski mountaineer.

After good results in younger age classes, for example 3rd in the single race event of the 2002 World Championship of Ski Mountaineering, 2003 European "juniors" runner-up and 2004 European "espoirs" champion, she competed in the 2005 European Championship of Ski Mountaineering. Together with Cristina Bes Ginesta and Emma Roca Rodríguez she finished fifth in the relay event ("seniors" ranking).

References 

1983 births
Living people
Spanish female ski mountaineers
Sportspeople from Aragon
21st-century Spanish women